A beachcomber is a person who practices beachcombing.

Beachcomber or Beachcombers may also refer to:

Arts and entertainment
 The Beachcomber (1915 film), an American drama 
 The Beachcomber (1938 film), starring Charles Laughton and also known as Vessel of Wrath
 The Beachcomber (1954 film), starring Robert Newton and Donald Sinden
 The Beachcomber (TV series), a British series premiering in 1962
 The Beachcombers, a Canadian TV series premiering in 1972
 Beach Combers, a 1936 Walter Lantz cartoon
 Beachcomber (Transformers), the name of multiple characters in the Transformers universe
 Beachcomber (pen name), a nom de plume used by several British humorous columnists, chiefly J. B. Morton

Other uses
 Beachcomber, Victoria, Australia
 Beachcomber (island), one of the Mamanuca Islands in Fiji
 Beachcomber Resorts & Hotels, a Mauritius-based hospitality company
 Beach Comber, a carrier pigeon
 Beachcomber 6.5, a class of yacht
 Beachcomber (bus), a pair of services in Yorkshire